Nguruka is an administrative ward in Uvinza District of Kigoma Region in Tanzania. 
In 2016 the Tanzania National Bureau of Statistics report there were 29,916 people in the ward, from 27,179 in 2012.

Villages / neighborhoods 
The ward has 4 villages and 22 hamlets.

 Bweru Bweru
 Bweru Kusini
 Kaguruka
 Kaskazini
 Majengo
 Ruhama
 Itebula
 Itebula
 Kalemela
 Kamfuba
 Lugongoni
 Songati A
 Songati B
 Nguruka
 Chemchem
 Mkoronga
 Nguruka Kaskazini
 Nguruka Kusini
 Nyangabo
 Bulilang’ombe
 Humule
 Nyangabo Kaskazini
 Nyangabo Kati
 Nyangabo Kusini
 Reli Mpya
 Zegi

References

Wards of Kigoma Region